Beech Grove or Beechgrove, Tennessee may refer to:

Beech Grove, Anderson County, Tennessee
Beechgrove, Coffee County, Tennessee
Beech Grove, Dyer County, Tennessee
Beech Grove, Grainger County, Tennessee
Beech Grove, Knox County, Tennessee
Beech Grove, Trousdale County, Tennessee
Beech Grove (Nashville, Tennessee), a mansion listed on the National Register of Historic Places